Sphaeroderus stenostomus is a species of ground beetle in the family Carabidae. It is found in North America.

Subspecies
These three subspecies belong to the species Sphaeroderus stenostomus:
 Sphaeroderus stenostomus aequalis Casey, 1920
 Sphaeroderus stenostomus lecontei Dejean, 1826
 Sphaeroderus stenostomus stenostomus (Weber, 1801)

References

Further reading

 

Carabinae
Articles created by Qbugbot
Beetles described in 1801